Executive (exe., exec., execu.) may refer to:

Role or title
 Executive, a senior management role in an organization
 Chief executive officer (CEO), one of the highest-ranking corporate officers (executives) or administrators
 Executive director, job title of the chief executive in many non-profit, government and international organizations; also a description contrasting with non-executive director  
 Executive officer, a high-ranking member of a corporation body, government or military
 Business executive, a person responsible for running an organization
 Music executive or record executive, person within a record label who works in senior management
 Studio executive, employee of a film studio
 Executive producer, a person who oversees the production of an entertainment product
 Account executive, a job title given by a number of marketing agencies (usually to trainee staff who report to account managers)
 Project executive, a role with the overall responsibility of a project, typically required for larger or more complex projects
 Executive education, term used for programs at graduate-level business schools that aim to educate managers or entrepreneurs

Function 
 Executive (government), branch of government that has authority and responsibility for the administration of state bureaucracy
 Executive functions or executive system, theorized cognitive system in psychology that controls and manages other cognitive processes

Arts, entertainment, and media
 Executive (magazine), a Lebanese business monthly
 The Executive, a fictional raincoat in the Seinfeld episode "The Raincoats"
 The Executive, a musical band including Andrew Ridgeley and George Michael before the formation of Wham!

Brands and enterprises
 Chrysler Executive, a car offered 1983–1986
 Sinclair Executive, an electronic calculator offered in the early 1970s

Computing and technology
 Executive (operating system), the operating system for the ICL 290x range of computers
 The Windows Executive, internal part of modern Microsoft Windows operating systems

Other uses
 Executive car, in Britain: an automobile larger than a large family car
 Executive paper size (often )

See also
 
 Executive order (disambiguation), a form of act issued by a number of the executive branch of a central government